"Backdoor" is a song by American rapper Lil Durk, from his sixth studio album, The Voice . It was released as the third single, on December 21, 2020, three days before the album. The song is a tribute to Durk's labelmate and friend, King Von, who was shot and killed outside an Atlanta nightclub in November 2020. The video sees Durk wearing Von's signature O'Block chain, which Von approved of before his death.

Background
Lil Durk and King Von were frequent collaborators, starting with 2019's "Crazy Story" remix and "Twin Nem", and 2020's "All These Niggas", "Baguette's" and "Down Me". Both artists hail from Chicago's O'Block section. Von garnered notoriety through his affiliation with Durk. "Backdoor" honors Von who died in November 2020 at the age of 26 after being shot outside the Monaco Hookah Lounge in Atlanta following a reported argument. The shootout resulted in the deaths of two men. "Backdoor" was released following Durk's one-month social media hiatus. He promoted the song with the hashtag #DoIt4Von.

Composition
Apart from the song being a tribute to King Von, it also sees Durk touch on his own personal struggles and cautioning on the dangers of running the streets. Over the piano-led instrumental, Durk references his success, fake love, and promises to make Von proud in the years to come.

Critical reception
Billboards Rania Aniftos deemed it a "stirring" song. The Faders Jordan Darville noted the video for being "an appropriately melancholy sight for a song with disappointment and betrayal simmering beneath the flexing".

Music video
The song's video accompanied its release. Directed by Jerry Production, it features a "subtle but touching" tribute to King Von. In the visual, Durk wears Von's signature O'Block chain, flaunting it in front of the camera. Prior to the song's release, Durk revealed in an Instagram Stories a text message conversation he and Von had, in which Durk informed Von that he would be filming the music video with the chain on that day, and Von replying that he will get it cleaned for him. Durk also sports the chain on the song's cover art. Furthermore in the video, he is also seen flaunting his riches, and pays tribute to his late cousin, OTF Nunu.

Charts

Certifications

References

2020 songs
2020 singles
Lil Durk songs
Geffen Records singles
Songs written by Lil Durk